Iambrix stellifer, the starry bob or Malay chestnut bob, is a butterfly of the family Hesperiidae. It is found in southern Burma, Laos, Thailand, Malaysia and Singapore, as well as on Borneo, Sumatra, Nias, Java, Batoe and Mentawi. The habitat consists of forested lowland areas.

The wingspan is about 25 mm.

The larvae feed on bamboo species. They are pale green with a yellow head.

References

 Iambrix stellifer stellifer in butterfly.nss.org.sg

Ancistroidini
Butterflies described in 1879